Lutzelfrau is a witch in German folklore who gives gifts — particularly apples, nuts and dried plums — to children on Saint Lucy's Day (December 13). Lutzelfrau customs are also common in Slovenia and Croatia, where a "dark Luz" was contrasted to the Christian saint.

References 

Christmas characters
Croatian folklore
Legendary German people
Slovenian folklore
Witchcraft in Germany
Witches in folklore